Bartolome Vicente Orpilla Bacarro (born September 18, 1966) is a retired Philippine Army lieutenant general who served as the 58th chief of staff of the Armed Forces of the Philippines from 2022 to 2023. He previously commanded the Southern Luzon Command. In 1991, Bacarro was awarded the Armed Forces of the Philippines Medal of Valor for his actions against the New People's Army in Maconacon, Isabela.

Education 
Bartolome Vicente Orpilla Bacarro graduated the Philippine Military Academy as part of Maringal Class of 1988 earning his commission as a Philippine Army second lieutenant. He completed his Command and General Staff Course at the United States Army Command and General Staff College at Fort Leavenworth.

Military career 
Throughout his military career in the Philippine Army, Bacarro has served as Internal Auditor of the Armed Forces of the Philippines and Chief of Staff of the 4th Infantry Division. He has also assumed command of the 502nd Infantry Brigade, of the 2nd Infantry Division, and of the Cadet Corps of the Philippine Military Academy.

In August 2022, President Bongbong Marcos appointed Bacarro  as the chief of staff of the Armed Forces of the Philippines. He retired on January 7, 2023.

Commandant of Cadets 

On September 18, 2019, Philippine Military Academy plebe Darwin Dormitorio was declared dead on arrival at the Fort del Pilar Hospital in Baguio due to injuries sustained from hazing at the academy. Separate investigations by the Inspector General of the Armed Forces of the Philippines and by the Secretary of Justice Menardo Guevarra and National Bureau of Investigation ensued. Bacarro, together with the Philippine Military Academy Superintendent, Lieutenant General Ronnie Evangelista, tendered his resignation "in the military tradition of command responsibility". Charges were filed against the two generals, but were cleared by Baguio Prosecutors for lack of probable cause.

Southern Luzon Command 
On July 25, 2021, Bacarro replaced retiring Lieutenant General Antonio Parlade Jr. as commander of the Southern Luzon Command. 

Representative Rufus Rodriguez of the 2nd District of Cagayan de Oro, the hometown of Cadet Darwin Dormitorio, appealed to recall the appointment of Bacarro and urged the Department of Justice to review the general's exoneration, specifically against the Anti-Hazing Act of 1995 that holds responsible those who could have prevented hazing activities but have not done so.

Awards

Medal of Valor 
In January 1991, then 2nd Lieutenant Bacarro was the commander of the 6th Citizen Armed Force Geographical Unit Active Auxiliary Company of the 5th Infantry Division's 21st Infantry Battalion. In Maconacon, Isabela, his unit figured in a 10-hour firefight against approximately 150 New People's Army rebels. Despite being wounded in his left thigh, he scaled a 9-foot fence surrounding the compound where his unit was pinned down by enemy fire. He then commandeered a truck and rammed the wall, providing his unit an exit point. He then had his wounded men evacuated, along with a wounded civilian. His 50-man force suffered three killed in action casualties and the communist rebels, sixteen.

He was subsequently awarded the Armed Forces of the Philippines Medal of Valor by President Corazon Cojuangco Aquino on July 1, 1991 for his actions.

Citation 
"By direction of the President, pursuant to paragraph 1-6a, Section II, Chapter 1, AFP Regulations G131-053, General Headquarters, Armed Forces of the Philippines, dated 1 July 1991, the MEDAL FOR VALOR is hereby awarded to:

For acts of conspicuous courage, gallantry and intrepidity at the risk of life above and beyond the call of duty during a ten-hour encounter with about 150 fully armed communist terrorists that attacked the town of Maconacon, Isabela on 26 to 27 January 1991, while serving as Commanding Officer, 6th CAFGU Active Auxiliary Company, 21st Infantry Battalion, 5th Infantry Division, Philippine Army.

In spite of the overwhelming number of the armed insurgents and aware of the lack of air and artillery fire support and without any possible troop reinforcement due to time, location and weather constraints, then SECOND LIEUTENANT BACARRO courageously closed-in and engaged the enemy in a fierce firefight. Despite being wounded, he executed a systematic attack through proper maneuvers and strict adherence to fire discipline by firing only at sure enemy targets to conserve their ammunition and spare the civilians from being caught in the crossfire. He  led his team in inflicting maximum casualty on the enemy. His display of unflinching and indomitable courage inspired and motivated his men to fight courageously.

Disregarding the pain and oozing blood due to the wound in his left thigh, he climbed a nine-foot high fence of the ACME compound even under heavy enemy fire, commandeered one dump truck, and rammed the fence that provided an entry point to his men outside, thereby releasing enemy pressure to the members of the Civilian Armed Forces Geographical Unit who were pinned down by the enemy inside the compound. He also extricated one wounded civilian, along with his men, for immediate treatment.

Under his leadership, his men fought ferociously, denying the enemy to overrun the town. His gallant efforts resulted in the killing of 16 terrorists, wounding of several others, recovery of 1 Caliber 7.62 mm M14 rifle, one Caliber .30 M1 Garand rifle, one claymore mine and one home-made land mine. By these outstanding deeds, FIRST LIEUTENANT BACARRO exemplified himself in combat in keeping with the finest tradition of Filipino soldiery."

Personal life
Bacarro is married to Soledad Bonsato from Baguio with whom he has three children.

References

Armed Forces of the Philippines Medal of Valor
Recipients of the Philippine Medal of Valor
Philippine Army personnel
Filipino generals
Philippine Military Academy alumni
Chairmen of the Joint Chiefs (Philippines)
Bongbong Marcos administration personnel